Great Northern Hotel was a historic hotel in Chicago's Loop area. It was located at the northeast corner of Jackson Boulevard and Dearborn Street in Chicago, Illinois. The building was designed by Burnham and Root. They created a new design, with an urban office block floor plan that was free of historical or European influences. The site is now occupied by the  Dirksen Federal Building.

History

The Great Northern Hotel opened in 1892 with 16-story, 500 rooms, 8 dining rooms, and 6 elevators. The cost of the building was $1,150,000. The building was made with a steel structure and was one of the first fireproof hotels in Chicago. The hotel was constructed by the architecture firm of D. H. Burnham and Company. They created a new design, with an urban office block floor plan that was free of historical or European influences. When the building was constructed in 1892, The Enquirer was located in the hotel.

The hotel was described as the "Chicago Hotel," but owner, Alvin Hulbert of Hulbert & Eden changed the name to the "Great Northern." The hotel was popular during the 1893 Chicago World's Fair. It was close to the World's Fair and Woolworth's Department Stores.

After John Wellborn Root's death in 1891, Daniel Burnham built the Great Northern Office and Theatre Building at 20 W. Jackson Boulevard. The Northern hotel and 16-story office building were connected and formed a half block and shared the largest interior court in Chicago at that time. The theater had a seating capacity of 2,000. An Aeolian Pipe Organ at the Great Northern Hotel was built and installed in 1896. In 1910, the hotel had a new Cafe Grill and lunch room. In the 1930s, a remodel resulted in a reduction to 400 rooms with private bathrooms.

The Great Northern hotel was demolished in 1940 and replaced with a one story taxpayer. The Great Northern Office and Theatre Building, as well as other buildings, were demolished in 1961 to make way for the  Dirksen Federal Building, built in 1964.

References

External links

Demolished hotels in Chicago
1892 establishments in Illinois
1940 disestablishments in the United States
Hotels established in 1892
Hotels disestablished in 1940